JACC may refer to:

 Java Acceleration system (the University of Manchester, James Clarkson et al)
 Journal of the American College of Cardiology, a cardiovascular journal
Joyce Athletics & Convention Center, a multi-purpose arena on the campus of the University of Notre Dame in South Bend, Indiana.
 Joint Agency Coordination Centre - Australian government body coordinating the search for Malaysia Airlines Flight 370